The following are notable keyboard players, mostly in the fields of metal, rock, and jazz.

0-9
2-D (Gorillaz)

A
Ryan Adams (Ryan Adams & the Cardinals, Whiskeytown)
Terry Adams (NRBQ, The Minus 5)
Jim Adkins (Jimmy Eat World)
Nat Adderley Jr.
Don Airey (Rainbow, Ozzy Osbourne, Deep Purple, Whitesnake)
Damon Albarn (The Good, the Bad & the Queen, Blur)
Art Alexakis (Everclear)
Dottie Alexander (of Montreal)
Kris Allen 
Gregg Allman (The Allman Brothers Band)
Tori Amos
Andre Andersen (Royal Hunt)
Gladstone Anderson  
Benny Andersson (Hep Stars, ABBA, Benny Anderssons Orkester)
Rod Argent (The Zombies, Argent)
Billie Joe Armstrong (Green Day)
Kenneth Ascher 
Daniel Ash (Bauhaus)
Tony Ashton
Lorentz Aspen (Theatre of Tragedy)
Brian Auger 
Bryce Avary (The Rocket Summer)
Mark Avsec (Wild Cherry, Donnie Iris & the Cruisers)
Caroline Azar (Fifth Column)

B
Guy Babylon (Elton John Band)
Burt Bacharach
Wally Badarou (Compass Point All Stars)
Anita Baker
Bam Margera (Gnarkill)
Nick "Peanut" Baines (Kaiser Chiefs)
Alex Band (The Calling)
Marcia Ball
Louis Banks
Tony Banks (Genesis)
Robert Banks
Hugh Banton (Van der Graaf Generator)
Tommy Barbarella (The New Power Generation) 
Richard Barbieri (Japan, Porcupine Tree)
Peter Bardens (Camel)
H. B. Barnum
Mike Barson (Madness)
Mark Batson (Aftermath Entertainment, Hollywood Records)
Harold Battiste  
Eric Bazilian (The Hooters)
Paul Beaver
Beck
Barry Beckett (Muscle Shoals Rhythm Section, Traffic) 
Brian Bell (Weezer, Space Twins, The Relationship)
Richard Bell (Janis Joplin, The Band)
Thom Bell (MFSB, Elton John)
Matt Bellamy (Muse)
Marco Benevento (Benevento/Russo Duo)
Howard Benson 
Jeff Bhasker 
Mickey Billingham (Dexys Midnight Runners, General Public, The Beat)
Diane Birch
Roy Bittan (E Street Band)
James Booker 
Perry Botkin Jr.  
Roddy Bottum (Faith No More)
David Bowie
Owen Bradley 
Michelle Branch
David Briggs (Muscle Shoals Rhythm Section, Area Code 615, Elvis Presley, The Nashville A-Team)
Tom Brislin (Spiraling)
Gary Brooker (Procol Harum)
Dudley Brooks (Elvis Presley)
Drew Brown (OneRepublic)
James Brown
Michael Brown (The Left Banke)
Tony Brown (Elvis Presley, The Notorious Cherry Bombs) 
Jackson Browne
Dave Brubeck
Jack Bruce (Cream)
David Bryan (Bon Jovi)
Kim Bullard 
John Bundrick (The Who, Free, Bob Marley, Johnny Nash)
Kate Bush
Artie Butler 
Larry Butler
Ray Buttigieg
Brad Buxer  
Bobby Byrd (The J.B.'s)
Joseph Byrd (The United States of America)
David Byrne (Talking Heads)

C
Eduardo Cabra (Calle 13)
Brian Cadd (The Flying Burrito Brothers) 
Charlotte Caffey (The Go-Go's)
Jonathan Cain (Journey)
Joey Calderazzo
John Cale (The Velvet Underground)
Ronnie Caldwell (The Bar-Kays)
Bernie Calvert (The Hollies)
Tony Camillo 
Michel Camilo
Richie Cannata (Billy Joel Band)
Tony Carey (Rainbow)
Jon Carin (Pink Floyd, Roger Waters)
Vanessa Carlton
Jesse Carmichael (Maroon 5)
Tim Carmon 
Richard Carpenter (The Carpenters)
Chris Carrabba (Dashboard Confessional)
Paul Carrack (Ace, Roxy Music, Squeeze)
Gonzalo Carrera (Karnataka, Landmarq)
Bob Casale (Devo)
Gerald Casale (Devo)
Harry Wayne Casey (KC and the Sunshine Band)
David Cassidy 
Leonard Caston Jr. (Chess Records, Motown Records) 
Felix Cavaliere (The Rascals)
Rob Cavallo 
Bill Champlin (Chicago)
Nathan Chapman 
Ray Charles
Desmond Child
Jeff Chimenti (RatDog, The Dead)
Peter Christopherson (Throbbing Gristle)
Chick Churchill (Ten Years After)
Neil Cicierega (Lemon Demon)
Alan Clark (Dire Straits, Eric Clapton)
Gene Clark (The Byrds)
Charlie Clouser (Nine Inch Nails)
David Bennett Cohen (Country Joe and the Fish)
Jaz Coleman (Killing Joke)
Lisa Coleman (The Revolution)
Rahn Coleman (The Love Unlimited Orchestra)
Phil Collins
Jeff Cook (Alabama)
Rob Coombes (Supergrass)
Chick Corea (Return to Forever)
Billy Corgan (The Smashing Pumpkins)
Dave "Baby" Cortez
Alessandro Cortini (Nine Inch Nails)
Blair Cowan (Lloyd Cole and the Commotions)
Nathan "Nadaddy" Currin (Family Force 5)
Floyd Cramer 
Vincent Crane (Arthur Brown)
Dave Crawford 
Jesse Crawford
Andy Creeggan (Barenaked Ladies)
Max Crook (Del Shannon)
David Crosby (The Byrds, Crosby, Stills, Nash & Young)
David Cross (King Crimson)
Sheryl Crow
Brian Culbertson 
Burton Cummings (The Guess Who)
Joel Cummins (Umphrey's McGee)
Martin Crandall (The Shins)
Otis Lee Crenshaw

D
Bobby Dall (Poison)
Danger Mouse 
Dan Swanö
Jerry Dammers (The Specials)
Jay Darlington (Kula Shaker, Oasis)
Jeremy Dawson (Shiny Toy Guns)
Ray Davies (The Kinks)
Rick Davies (Supertramp)
Paul Davis
deadmau5
El DeBarge
Lenny Dee 
Frank Delgado (Deftones)
Austin de Lone
Tom DeLonge (Blink-182) 
Al De Lory
Jay DeMarcus (Rascal Flatts)
Ian Dench (EMF, Stargate)
Sandy Denny
Jimmy Destri (Blondie)
Dennis DeYoung (Styx) 
Travis Dickerson (Buckethead)
Jim Dickinson (The Dixie Flyers, Mud Boy and the Neutrons)
Mike Dirnt (Green Day)
Vince DiFiore (Cake)
Ronnie James Dio 
Gabe Dixon (The Gabe Dixon Band)
Craig Doerge (Judy Henske, Crosby, Stills and Nash, The Section, James Taylor, Jackson Browne)
Thomas Dolby
Fats Domino
Dan Donovan (Big Audio Dynamite, Dreadzone)
Neal Doughty (REO Speedwagon)
Chip Douglas (The Monkees, The Turtles)
Geoff Downes (Yes, Asia, The Buggles)
Tyrone Downie (Bob Marley and the Wailers, Compass Point All Stars)
Candida Doyle (Pulp)
Lamont Dozier 
Dr. Dre
Dr. John
Dr. Luke
Daryl Dragon (Captain & Tennille) 
Dennis Drew (10,000 Maniacs)
Christopher Dudley (Underoath)
George Duke (Frank Zappa and The Mothers of Invention)
Larry Dunn (Earth, Wind & Fire)
Stacy DuPree (Eisley)
Ruth Dyson

E
Mark Eddinger (Butthole Surfers)
The Edge (U2)
Joe Egan (Stealers Wheel)
Mike Elizondo
Joe Elliott (Def Leppard)
Keith Emerson (The Nice, Emerson, Lake & Palmer, 3)
Bobby Emmons (The Memphis Boys)
Brian Eno (Roxy Music) 
Jerry Eubanks (The Marshall Tucker Band)
John Evan (Jethro Tull)
Tommy Eyre

F
Donald Fagen (Steely Dan, Jay and the Americans, The Dukes of September)
Harold Faltermeyer
Andrew Farriss (INXS)
Danny Federici (E Street Band)
Don Felder (The Eagles)
Eric Drew Feldman (Captain Beefheart)
Jay Ferguson 
Russell Ferrante (Yellowjackets)
Doug Fieger (The Knack)
Billy Field
Robin Finck (Nine Inch Nails)
Mike Finnigan 
Matthew Fisher (Procol Harum)
Alan Fitzgerald (Night Ranger)
Five for Fighting
Roberta Flack
Flea (Red Hot Chili Peppers)
Andrew Fletcher (Depeche Mode)
Guy Fletcher (Dire Straits, Mark Knopfler)
Brandon Flowers (The Killers)
Dan Fogelberg
John Fogerty (Creedence Clearwater Revival)
Ben Folds (Ben Folds Five)
Jerome Fontamillas (Switchfoot)
Dane Forrest (The Scene)
David Foster 
Stan Free (Hot Butter, The Monkees, The Four Seasons, The Association)
Bobby Freeman 
Ernie Freeman
Jason Freese
David Freiberg (Jefferson Starship)
Glenn Frey (The Eagles)
Robert Fripp (King Crimson)
Eloy Fritsch (Apocalypse)
Mitchell Froom
Craig Frost (Grand Funk Railroad, Silver Bullet Band)
Magne Furuholmen (a-ha)
Ming Freeman (Yanni)
John Frusciante (Red Hot Chili Peppers)

G
Geir Bratland (Dimmu Borgir)
Peter Gabriel
Madonna Wayne Gacy (Marilyn Manson)
Lady Gaga
Mick(ey) Gallagher (Ian Dury and the Blockheads, Peter Frampton, The Clash)
Mike Garson
Boom Gaspar (Pearl Jam)
Bob Gaudio (The Royal Teens, The Four Seasons)
Marvin Gaye
Chris Geddes (Belle and Sebastian)
Maurice Gibb (Bee Gees)
Ian Gibbons (The Kinks)
Richard Gibbs (Oingo Boingo)
Jon Gibson
Gillian Gilbert (New Order)
Charlie Gillingham (Train, Counting Crows)
Charles Giordano (E Street Band, The Sessions Band, Pat Benatar)
Gregg Giuffria (Angel, Giuffria, House of Lords)
Keith Godchaux (Grateful Dead)
Dwayne Goettel (Skinny Puppy, Download, Doubting Thomas)
Andrew Gold
Loren Gold (The Who, Roger Daltrey)
Barry Goldberg (Electric Flag)
Larry Goldings 
Paul Gordon (Goo Goo Dolls)
Martin Gore (Depeche Mode)
Lawrence Gowan (Styx)
Kamal Gray  (The Roots)
Dave Greenfield (The Stranglers)
Jimmy Greenspoon (Three Dog Night)
Al Greenwood (Foreigner)
Jonny Greenwood (Radiohead)
Peter Griesar (Dave Matthews Band)
Gary Griffin 
Paul Griffin  
Johnny Griffith (The Funk Brothers)
Franny Griffiths (Space)
Don Grolnick

H
Joe Hahn (Linkin Park)
Emily Haines (Metric)
Daryl Hall (Hall & Oates)
Ellis Hall (Tower of Power)
Jan Hammer (The Mahavishnu Orchestra)
Peter Hammill (Van der Graaf Generator)
Herbie Hancock (The Headhunters)
Taylor Hanson (Hanson)
Glen Hardin
Mikko Härkin (Sonata Arctica)
Paul Harris 
George Harrison (The Beatles, Traveling Wilburys)
Jerry Harrison (Talking Heads)
Matthieu Hartley (The Cure)
Dan Hartman
Steve Harwell (Smash Mouth)
Donny Hathaway
Greg Hawkes (The Cars)
Isaac Hayes 
Scott Healy (The Max Weinberg 7)
Kevin Hearn (Barenaked Ladies)
John Helliwell (Supertramp)
Jimi Hendrix 
Ken Hensley (Uriah Heep)
Fredrik Hermansson (Pain of Salvation)
Beau Hill (Spider, then Shanghai)
Dusty Hill (ZZ Top)
Charles Hodges (Hi Rhythm Section) 
David Hodges
Roger Hodgson (Supertramp)
Dexter Holland (The Offspring)
Jools Holland (Squeeze)
Tuomas Holopainen (Nightwish)
James Hooker (Amazing Rhythm Aces)
Nicky Hopkins 
Bruce Hornsby
Paul Hornsby (The Marshall Tucker Band)
Simon House (Hawkwind)
James Newton Howard
Garth Hudson (The Band)
Joey Huffman  
Peter Hume (Evermore)
Joe Hunter (The Funk Brothers, John Lee Hooker, Dennis Edwards, The Hesitations)
Dick Hyman 
Rob Hyman (The Hooters)

I
Mitsuru Igarashi (Every Little Thing)
Ihsahn (Emperor, Ihsahn)
Giovanna Joyce Imbesi
Doug Ingle (Iron Butterfly)
Russ Irwin (Aerosmith, Sting, Clay Aiken, Bryan Adams)

J
Janet Jackson
Joe Jackson 
Michael Jackson 
Randy Jackson (The Jacksons)
Rami Jaffee (The Wallflowers, Foo Fighters)
Mick Jagger (The Rolling Stones) 
Bob James (Fourplay, Phil Collins, Quincy Jones, Paul Simon)
Rick James
Chas Jankel (Ian Dury and the Blockheads)
Keith Jarrett
John Barlow Jarvis
Chris Jasper (The Isley Brothers)
Jonas Jeberg
Arthur Jenkins 
Eddie Jobson (Curved Air, Roxy Music, Jethro Tull, Frank Zappa)
Billy Joel
Jens Johansson (Yngwie Malmsteen, Stratovarius)
Elton John
Matt Johnson (Jamiroquai)
Bruce Johnston (The Beach Boys)
Joakim Svalberg (Opeth)
Nick Jonas (Jonas Brothers)
Howard Jones
John Paul Jones (Led Zeppelin, Them Crooked Vultures)
Booker T. Jones (Booker T. & the M.G.'s)
Brian Jones (The Rolling Stones)
Craig Jones (Slipknot)
Melvyn "Deacon" Jones (Baby Huey & the Babysitters, Curtis Mayfield, John Lee Hooker, Freddie King)
Norah Jones
Lonnie Jordan (War)
Bradley Joseph (Sheena Easton, Yanni)
Jascha Richter (MLTR)
Tyler Joseph  (Twenty One Pilots)
Seth Justman (The J. Geils Band)

K
Tony Kakko (Sonata Arctica)
Artie Kane
Doug Katsaros 
Bob Katsionis (Septic Flesh, Firewind)
Tony Kaye (Yes, Flash, Badger, Detective, David Bowie, Badfinger, Yoso, Circa)
Howard Kaylan (The Turtles)
Jeff Kazee (Southside Johnny and the Asbury Jukes, Jon Bon Jovi)
Shane Keister 
Randy Kerber 
Ron Kersey (MFSB, The Trammps, Salsoul Orchestra)
Bert Keyes 
Alicia Keys
Mark Kelly (Marillion)
R. Kelly
Chris Kilmore (Incubus)
Carole King
Robbie King (Bobby Taylor & the Vancouvers, Skylark, The Hometown Band, Bryan Adams)
Henrik Klingenberg (Sonata Arctica)
Larry Knechtel (The Wrecking Crew, Bread, Paul Simon, Smith, Los Angeles musicians)
Holly Knight (Device, Spider)
Steve Knight (Mountain)
Josh Klinghoffer (Red Hot Chili Peppers)
Al Kooper (Bob Dylan, The Royal Teens, Blood, Sweat & Tears, Lynyrd Skynyrd, Mike Bloomfield, The Blues Project)
Kornelije Kovač (Indexi, Korni Grupa)
Dave Kikoski
Lenny Kravitz
Chantal Kreviazuk
Greg Kuehn (T.S.O.L.)

L
Les Smith (ex-Anathema, ex-Cradle of Filth)
Jef Labes (Van Morrison, Bonnie Raitt)
Robert Lamm (Chicago)
Allen Lanier (Blue Öyster Cult)
Dustin Lanker (Cherry Poppin' Daddies, The Visible Men)
Avril Lavigne
T Lavitz (Dixie Dregs)
Ben Leach (The Farm)
Chuck Leavell (The Allman Brothers Band, Sea Level, The Rolling Stones)
Amy Lee (Evanescence)
Geddy Lee (Rush)
Jerry Lee Lewis
Bill Leeb (Front Line Assembly)
John Lefler (Dashboard Confessional)
John Legend
Tom Lehrer
Bernie Leighton
John Lennon (The Beatles, Plastic Ono Band)
Joe Lester (Silversun Pickups)
Pete Levin (Gil Evans Orchestra)
Mike Levine (Triumph)
Howard Levy (Bela Fleck and the Flecktones)  
Earl Lindo (Bob Marley and the Wailers)
John Linnell (They Might Be Giants)
Little Richard
Kerry Livgren (Kansas)
John Locke (Spirit, Nazareth)
Jon Lord (Deep Purple, Whitesnake)
Christian Lorenz (Rammstein)
Chris Lowe (Pet Shop Boys)
Billy Lyall (Pilot)
Jeff Lynne (The Move)

M
Bridgit Mendler
Mustis (ex-Dimmu Borgir)
Tony MacAlpine
Brian "Too Loud" MacLeod (Chilliwack, Headpins)
Les Maguire (Gerry and the Pacemakers)
Raine Maida (Our Lady Peace)
Bob Malone 
Mark Mancina (Yes)
Fred Mandel (Queen, Elton John Band, Cheap Trick, Alice Cooper)
Manfred Mann (Manfred Mann, Manfred Mann Chapter Three, Manfred Mann's Earth Band)
Roger Joseph Manning Jr. (Jellyfish, Blink-182, Imperial Drag, TV Eyes)
Richard Manuel (The Band)
Ray Manzarek (The Doors)
Anthony Marinelli (Michael Jackson, Kenny Loggins)
Chris Marion (Little River Band)
Bruno Mars
Tommy Mars (Frank Zappa)
Chris Martin (Coldplay)
Max Martin 
Harvey Mason Jr. (The Underdogs) 
Brian May (Queen)
Bob Mayo (Peter Frampton)
Lincoln Mayorga
Lyle Mays (Pat Metheny Group)
Nick McCarthy (Franz Ferdinand)
Linda McCartney (Wings)
Paul McCartney (The Beatles, Wings, The Fireman)
Glenn McClelland (Ween, Blood, Sweat & Tears)
Page McConnell (Phish)
Clarence McDonald 
Ian McDonald (King Crimson, Foreigner)
Michael McDonald (The Doobie Brothers)
Richie McDonald (Lonestar)
Roger McGuinn (The Byrds)
Goldy McJohn (Steppenwolf, Janis Joplin)
Bonnie McKee
Ron "Pigpen" McKernan (Grateful Dead)
Brian McKnight
Sarah McLachlan
Ian McLagan (The Rolling Stones, The Faces, Rod Stewart)
Gabrial McNair (No Doubt)
Christine McVie (Fleetwood Mac)
Jonathan Melvoin (The Smashing Pumpkins, The Revolution) 
Mike Melvoin (The Wrecking Crew)
Freddie Mercury (Queen)
Augie Meyers (Sir Douglas Quintet, Texas Tornados)
Mic Michaeli (Europe, Brazen Abbot)
Lee Michaels
Max Middleton (Jeff Beck, Hummingbird)
Amos Milburn
Barry Miles 
Steve Miller (Steve Miller Band)
Mike Mills (R.E.M.)
Kerry Minnear (Gentle Giant)
Paul Mirkovich
Joni Mitchell
Jim Moginie (Midnight Oil)
Money Mark (Beastie Boys)
Kevin Moore (Dream Theater)
Brian Molko (Placebo)
Patrick Moraz (The Moody Blues, Yes)
Gordon Mote
Mark Mothersbaugh (Devo)
Jamie Muhoberac
Larry Muhoberac (Elvis Presley)
Stan Munsey (Shenandoah)
Brent Mydland (Grateful Dead)
Thelonious Monk

N
Graham Nash (The Hollies, Crosby, Stills, Nash & Young)
Steve Nathan (Muscle Shoals Rhythm Section, The Nashville A-Team)
Bobbie Nelson (The Family, The Strangers)
Art Neville (The Meters, Allen Toussaint, The Neville Brothers)
Ivan Neville (The Neville Brothers, Keith Richards, Spin Doctors)
Randy Newman
Nico 
Steve Nieve (Elvis Costello) 
Jack Nitzsche (The Wrecking Crew, The Rolling Stones, Crazy Horse, Willy DeVille)
Erik Norlander
Christopher North (Ambrosia)
Aldo Nova
Krist Novoselic (Nirvana, Flipper, Eyes Adrift, Mike Watt) 
Geoff Nicholls (Black Sabbath)
Peter Noone (Herman's Hermits)

O
Roger O'Donnell (The Cure)
Bobby Ogdin (Elvis Presley, The Marshall Tucker Band)
Mike Oldfield
Spooner Oldham (FAME Studios, Muscle Shoals Rhythm Section, Dan Penn, Neil Young)
Michael Omartian 
William Orbit
Alan Osmond (The Osmonds)

P
Augustus Pablo
David Paich (Toto)
Amanda Palmer
Oliver Palotai (Kamelot, Sons of Seasons)
Lou Pardini (Chicago)
Ian Parker (The Hollies, Tom Robinson Band)
Van Dyke Parks
Alan Parsons (The Alan Parsons Project)
Alan Pasqua (Damn Yankees)
Bill Payne (Little Feat, Leftover Salmon, Linda Ronstadt, Phil Lesh and Friends, The Doobie Brothers)
Ryan Peake (Nickelback)
Freddie Perren (The Corporation, The Jackson 5, The Sylvers, Dino Fekaris)
Jerry Peters
Oscar Peterson 
Kate Pierson (The B-52's)
Leena Peisa (Lordi)
Leon Pendarvis (Saturday Night Live Band, The Blues Brothers)
Alex Pennie (The Automatic)
Jim Peterik (Survivor)
Greg Phillinganes (Quincy Jones, Stevie Wonder, The Pussycat Dolls, Bruno Mars, Michael Jackson, Toto)
Scott Phillips (Creed, Alter Bridge)
Mike Pinder (The Moody Blues)
Michael Pinnella (Symphony X)
Dan Pinto
Dave Pirner (Soul Asylum)
Chris Pitman (Guns N' Roses)
Tuomas Planman (Norther)
Morris Pleasure
Steve Porcaro (Toto)
Grace Potter (Grace Potter and the Nocturnals, Kenny Chesney)
Billy Powell (Lynyrd Skynyrd) 
Martin Powell (ex-Cradle of Filth)
Roger Powell (Todd Rundgren, David Bowie)
Vlado Pravdić (Bijelo Dugme)
Billy Preston 
Don Preston (Frank Zappa and The Mothers of Invention, Abnuceals Emuukha Electric Symphony Orchestra)
Alan Price (The Animals)
Prince 
Professor Longhair
Vadim Pruzhanov (DragonForce)
Bill Pursell 
Janne Puurtinen (HIM)

R
A. R. Rahman
Ronnie Rancifer (The Jackson 5)
Don Randi (The Wrecking Crew)
Mike Ratledge (Soft Machine)
Allen Ravenstine (Pere Ubu)
Paul Raymond (UFO, Savoy Brown, Plastic Penny)
Eddie Rayner (Split Enz, The Makers) 
Jason Rebello (Jeff Beck, Sting)
Dizzy Reed (Guns N' Roses)
Ellen Reid (Crash Test Dummies) 
Trent Reznor (Nine Inch Nails)
Doug Rhodes (The Music Machine, The Millennium)
Nick Rhodes (Duran Duran)
Tim Rice-Oxley (Keane)
Lionel Richie 
Jascha Richter (Michael Learns to Rock)
Doug Riley 
Laza Ristovski (Smak, Bijelo Dugme)
Billy Ritchie (Clouds)
Tyson Ritter (The All-American Rejects)
Hargus "Pig" Robbins (The Nashville A-Team)
J. Peter Robinson 
Ed Roland (Collective Soul)
Gregg Rolie (Santana, Journey, Ringo Starr) 
Matt Rollings (Mark Knopfler, Willie Nelson, Lyle Lovett, Alison Krauss)
David Rosenthal (Rainbow, Billy Joel Band)
Chris Ross (Wolfmother)
Share Ross (The Dogs D'Amour)
Jean Roussel 
Michel Rubini (The Wrecking Crew)
Jordan Rudess (Dream Theater, The Dixie Dregs)
Vic Ruggiero (The Slackers)
Patrice Rushen (CAB)
Leon Russell 
Francis Rimbert
Ryuichi Sakamoto (Yellow Magic Orchestra)

S
Stian Aarstad (ex-Dimmu Borgir)
Joe Sample (The Crusaders, B.B. King, George Benson, Eric Clapton, L.A. Express, Joni Mitchell, Los Angeles musicians)
David Sancious (E Street Band, Santana, Jeff Beck, Sting)
Merl Saunders (Grateful Dead)
Satyr (Satyricon, Wongraven)
Rick Savage (Def Leppard)
Tony Scalzo (Fastball)
Falk Maria Schlegel (Powerwolf)
Artie Schroeck 
Ralph Schuckett (Utopia, Carole King, Bette Midler, Moogy Klingman, Sophie B. Hawkins)
Klaus Schulze (Ash Ra Tempel, Tangerine Dream)
James Honeyman-Scott (The Pretenders)
Brady Seals (Little Texas)
Pete Sears (Rod Stewart, Jefferson Starship)
John Sebastian (The Lovin' Spoonful)
Neil Sedaka
Bob Seger
Matt Serletic 
Paul Shaffer (CBS Orchestra, Saturday Night Live Band, The Blues Brothers)
John Shanks
Lee Shapiro (Frankie Valli and the Four Seasons) 
John Philip Shenale 
Derek Sherinian (Dream Theater, Planet X, Alice Cooper, Yngwie Malmsteen)
Greg Sherman (Glass)
Mike Shinoda (Linkin Park)
Ben Sidran (Steve Miller Band)
Bunny Sigler (Gamble and Huff, Curtis Mayfield, Curtom Records, MFSB, Salsoul Orchestra)
Erna Siikavirta (Lordi)
Josh Silver (Type O Negative)
John Simon 
Claudio Simonetti (Goblin)
Dave Sinclair (Caravan)
Ray Singleton
Matt Skiba (Blink-182, Alkaline Trio)
Jocke Skog (Clawfinger)
Martin Slattery (The Mescaleros, The Hours)
Grace Slick (Jefferson Airplane)
George Small (John Lennon, Carl Perkins, John Phillips, Eric Clapton)
Mike Smith (The Dave Clark Five)
Robert Smith (The Cure)
Rosie Smith (Cradle of Filth)
William "Smitty" Smith 
C. J. Snare (FireHouse)
Tom Snow
Richard Sohl (Patti Smith Group)
Zsa Zsa Speck (Marilyn Manson)
Martijn Spierenburg (Within Temptation)
Chris Stainton (Joe Cocker's Grease Band)
Baby Lloyd Stallworth 
Justin Stanley (Noiseworks)
Mark Stanway (Magnum, Grand Slam)
Alex Staropoli (Rhapsody of Fire)
Margita Stefanović (Ekatarina Velika)
Mark Stein (Vanilla Fudge)
Louie Stephens (Rooney)
William "Mickey" Stevenson
Ian Stewart (The Rolling Stones)
Stephen Stills (Buffalo Springfield, Crosby, Stills, Nash & Young) 
Sting (The Police) 
Rose Stone (Sly and the Family Stone)
Sly Stone (Sly and the Family Stone)
Barrett Strong 
Andy Summers (The Police) 
Bernard Sumner (New Order, Joy Division, Electronic)
Sun Ra 
Rob Swire (Pendulum, Knife Party)
David Sylvian (Japan)

T
Mick Talbot (The Merton Parkas, Dexys Midnight Runners, The Bureau, The Style Council)
Richard Tandy (Electric Light Orchestra)
Serj Tankian (System of a Down)
Butch Taylor (Dave Matthews Band, Secrets)
Roger Taylor (Queen)
Ryan Tedder (OneRepublic)
Richard Tee 
Rod Temperton (Heatwave, Michael Jackson, Quincy Jones)
Joey Tempest (Europe)
Benmont Tench (Tom Petty and the Heartbreakers, Mudcrutch, Roy Orbison, Johnny Cash, Stevie Nicks, Don Henley, Jon Bon Jovi, Works Progress Administration)
Matt Thiessen (Relient K, Matthew Thiessen and the Earthquakes)
Chris Thomas
Marvell Thomas (The Mar-Keys, The Bar-Kays)
Rob Thomas (Matchbox Twenty) 
Sonny Thompson
Justin Timberlake
Keith Tippett (King Crimson)
Lol Tolhurst (The Cure)
Peter Tork (The Monkees)
Allen Toussaint 
Pete Townshend (The Who)
Meghan Trainor 
KT Tunstall
Archie Turner (Hi Rhythm Section)
Ike Turner (Kings of Rhythm) 
Aphex Twin
Steven Tyler (Aerosmith)

U
Ian Underwood (Frank Zappa and The Mothers of Invention) 
Brendon Urie (Panic! at the Disco)
Michael Utley (The Dixie Flyers, Coral Reefer Band)

V
Rubén Valtierra ("Weird Al" Yankovic)
Earl Van Dyke (The Funk Brothers)
Eddie Van Halen (Van Halen)
Victoria Asher (Cobra Starship)
Joe Vitale (Barnstorm, Crosby, Stills, Nash & Young, The Eagles, Ted Nugent)

W
Jason Wade (Lifehouse)
Tom Waits
Adam Wakeman (Black Sabbath, Headspace, Strawbs, Ozzy Osbourne)
Oliver Wakeman (Yes, Strawbs)
Rick Wakeman (Yes, David Bowie, Strawbs, Elton John, Anderson Bruford Wakeman Howe, Anderson, Rabin and Wakeman)
Randy Waldman (Barbra Streisand, Frank Sinatra, Michael Jackson, Michael Bublé, George Benson)
Butch Walker
Don Walker (Cold Chisel)
Johnny "Big Moose" Walker
Joe Walsh (The Eagles, Barnstorm)
Steve Walsh (Kansas)
Harry Waters (Roger Waters)
Jimmy Webb 
John Webster (Poison, Aerosmith)
Tina Weymouth (Talking Heads)
Pete Wingfield
Nick Wheeler (The All-American Rejects) 
Barry White
Jack White (The White Stripes)
Norman Whitfield 
Bobby Whitlock (Eric Clapton, Delaney & Bonnie, George Harrison)
Carson Whitsett (Malaco Records, The MG's, The Imperial Show Band, Kathy Mattea)
Per Wiberg (ex-Opeth)
Paul Wickens (Paul McCartney)
Alan Wilder (Depeche Mode, Recoil)
Hayley Williams (Paramore)
Larry Williams 
Milan Williams (Commodores)
Ann Wilson (Heart)
Brian Wilson (The Beach Boys)
Dan Wilson (Semisonic)
Mark Wilson (Jet)
Steven Wilson (Storm Corrosion)
Kip Winger (Winger)
Edgar Winter
Steve Winwood (The Spencer Davis Group, Traffic, Jimi Hendrix, Billy Joel, Phil Collins, Blind Faith, Go)
Janne Wirman (Children of Bodom)
Bill Withers
Peter Wolf (Frank Zappa, Starship)
 Chris Wolstenholme (Muse)
Stevie Wonder
Eric Woolfson (The Alan Parsons Project)
Bernie Worrell (Talking Heads, Funkadelic, The Pretenders)
Gary Wright (Spooky Tooth, George Harrison, Eric Clapton, Ringo Starr)
Richard Wright (Pink Floyd)
Winston Wright (Toots and the Maytals)
Howard Wyeth
Richard "Popcorn" Wylie
Reese Wynans (Double Trouble, Carole King, Captain Beyond, Los Lonely Boys)

Y
"Weird Al" Yankovic
Yanni
Jerry Yester (The Lovin' Spoonful, The Association)
Thom Yorke (Radiohead)
John Young (Scorpions)
Neil Young
Doug Yule (The Velvet Underground)

Z
Aidan Zammit
Zardonic 
Joe Zawinul (Weather Report)
Marco Coti Zelati (Lacuna Coil)
Warren Zevon
Torrie Zito
David Zollo
Nikola Zorić (Riblja Čorba)

See also

Lists of musicians

References

Lists of musicians by instrument